Joseph Martin Dubois (27 December 1927 – July 1987) was a Northern Irish football outside forward who played in the Football League for Halifax Town, Doncaster Rovers and Grimsby Town.

References

Association footballers from Northern Ireland
NIFL Premiership players
Association football outside forwards
1927 births
People from Newtownabbey
Linfield F.C. players
English Football League players
Doncaster Rovers F.C. players
Northern Ireland amateur international footballers
1987 deaths
Bedford Town F.C. players
Northern Ireland youth international footballers
Grimsby Town F.C. players
Halifax Town A.F.C. players
Brantwood F.C. players
Southern Football League players